Chintulov Ridge (‘Chintulov Hrebet’ \'chin-tu-lov 'hre-bet\) is the rocky ridge extending 6.9 km in north-northwest to south-southeast direction and 2.6 km wide, rising to 1145 m in Aristotle Mountains on Oscar II Coast in Graham Land. It is situated in the southeast foothills of Mount Sara Teodora, surmounting Ambergris Glacier to the west, and Flask Glacier and one of its tributaries to the south and east respectively.  The feature is named after the Bulgarian poet Dobri Chintulov (1822-1886), in connection with the settlement Chintulovo in Southeastern Bulgaria.

Location
British mapping in 1976.

Maps
 British Antarctic Territory.  Scale 1:200000 topographic map.  DOS 610 Series, Sheet W 65 62.  Directorate of Overseas Surveys, Tolworth, UK, 1976.
 Antarctic Digital Database (ADD). Scale 1:250000 topographic map of Antarctica. Scientific Committee on Antarctic Research (SCAR). Since 1993, regularly upgraded and updated.

Notes

References
 Chintulov Ridge. SCAR Composite Antarctic Gazetteer.
 Bulgarian Antarctic Gazetteer. Antarctic Place-names Commission. (details in Bulgarian, basic data in English)

External links
 Chintulov Ridge. Copernix satellite image

Ridges of Graham Land
Oscar II Coast
Bulgaria and the Antarctic